Wadi el-Natrun Prison is an Egyptian prison complex in the Beheira Governorate, north of Cairo. It consists of two separate facilities 5 kilometers apart.

2011 prison break
The prison was used to incarcerate Islamists and other political prisoners under the regime of Hosni Mubarak and after the Egyptian Revolution of 2011, several prominent Muslim Brotherhood activists were imprisoned there. On 30 January 2011, thousands of prisoners were helped to escape from the prison. Some prisoners have suggested that those responsible for freeing them were in fact police officers acting under Interior Ministry orders, though a June 2013 court concluded that Hamas and Hezbollah worked with the Muslim Brotherhood to orchestrate the jailbreak. 34 Brotherhood activists, including the future president Mohamed Morsi and Saad El-Katatni, were among those who escaped from the prison. After the coup against Morsi in July 2013, Morsi faced trial for his role in the prison break. He and 105 others were sentenced to death on 16 May 2015. The court of cassation in November 2016 overturned the death sentence on Morsi and five other Muslim Brotherhood members and then ordered a retrial for the similar charges.

References

Beheira Governorate
Prisons in Egypt
Prison escapes
2011 in Egypt